Feneley is a surname. Notable people with the surname include:

 Dustin Feneley (born 1982), Australian film director and screenwriter
 Jack Feneley (1858–1944), Australian businessman
 Michael Feneley, Australian cardiologist
 Roger Feneley (1933–2018), English urologist
 Will Feneley (born 1999), British freestyle skier

See also
 Fendley